Lake Murchison is a man-made water reservoir located in the western region of Tasmania, Australia. The lake is situated within the northern part of Tasmania's West Coast Range and is fed by the Murchison River, the George Creek, the Anthony River, and discharge from the Tribute Power Station.

Location and features
The Murchison Dam across the Murchison River was built by the Hydro-Electric Commission in 1982.

Lake Murchison forms part of the Pieman River power development that was completed in the 1980s. Upstream of Lake Murchison is the White Spur Lake and dam, Henty Lake and dam, Lake Newton and dam, Lake Plimsoll and Anthony Dam, and the Tribute Power Station. Downstream from Lake Murchison is Lake Mackintosh, Tullabardine Dam, Mackintosh Dam, Mackintosh Power Station, Lake Rosebery, Bastyan Dam, Bastyan Power Station, Lake Pieman, Reece Dam and the Reece Power Station.

Etymology
The naming of Lake Murchison is derived from the Murchison River and the adjacent Mount Murchison.

See also

List of reservoirs and dams in Tasmania
List of lakes in Tasmania
List of power stations in Tasmania

References

External links

Murchison
Pieman River Power Development